Weiwuying is a station on the Orange line of the Kaohsiung MRT in Lingya District, Kaohsiung, Taiwan. It will be a future transfer station with the Yellow line.

Station overview
The station is a two-level, underground station with an island platform and five exits. The station is 201 metres long and is located at the intersection of Jhongjheng 1st Rd. and Jianjyun Rd.

Station layout

Exits
Exit 1: Jhongjheng 1st Rd. (north), Jhongjheng Senior High School, Kaohsiung Armed Forces General Hospital
Exit 2: Jhongjheng 1st Rd. (south), Jhongjheng Park
Exit 3: Sanduo Rd. (north), Jhongjheng Park
Exit 4: Jianjyun Rd. (west), Kaohsiung Armed Forces General Hospital, Kaohsiung Mosque
Exit 5: Jianjyun Rd. (east)
Exit 6: Sanduo Rd. (south), Weiwuying Art & Culture Center, Weiwuying Mentropolitan Park

Around the station
 Kaohsiung Mosque 
 National Kaohsiung Center for the Arts
 Weiwuying Metropolitan Park
 Fengshan Sports Park
 Jhongjheng Park
 Jhongjheng Senior High School
 Kaohsiung Armed Forces General Hospital

See also
 List of railway stations in Taiwan

References

2008 establishments in Taiwan
Kaohsiung Metro Orange line stations
Lingya District
Railway stations opened in 2008